The Dallas, Garland and Northeastern Railroad  (Dallas, Garland & Northeastern Railroad) is a short-line railroad headquartered in Richardson, Texas. The company is a subsidiary of Genesee & Wyoming, having been acquired when GWRR purchased RailAmerica in 2012.

The line extends from Trenton, Texas to Garland, Texas, then from Garland to Dallas via trackage rights over Kansas City Southern Railway and Union Pacific. DGNO also operates from Sherman to McKinney, from Carrollton to Murphy and from Dallas to Lake Dallas.

Most of the railroad's traffic comes from stone products, scrap metal and wood products. DGNO hauled around 60,000 carloads in 2008.

References

External links

Genesse & Wyoming website with DGNO details

Texas railroads
RailAmerica
Transportation in Garland, Texas
Switching and terminal railroads
Spin-offs of the Union Pacific Railroad